InterConsult Bulgaria (ICB), established in Sofia, Bulgaria in 1996, focuses on Agile software development practices primarily based on Microsoft technology stack. ICB core competencies include also the development of Business process automation and Decision support system software, software platforms and applications for the Industrial Internet of Things (IIoT), as well as 3D simulation and Augmented reality  apps. ICB has delivered more than 350 projects for more than 50 customers in 10 countries.

History
 1996 - ICB (Interconsult Bulgaria Ltd.) is established as a Bulgarian-Norwegian company, part of the Norwegian IT consulting group [[Interconsult ASA]].
 2004 - Following the acquisition of Interconsult ASA and its shares in its subsidiaries, ICB becomes part of the Danish engineering consulting group COWI A/S.
 2008 - With a management buyout performed by the company's Bulgarian founders, ICB becomes a 100% private Bulgarian company.
 2010 - Wins the European IT Excellence Award 2010 at IT Europa.
 2011 - Becomes a 100+ employee company.

Key Projects

References

Consulting firms established in 1996
Software companies of Bulgaria
Software companies established in 1996
Bulgarian companies established in 1996